Second-seeded Doris Hart defeated Shirley Fry 6–4, 6–4 in the final to win the women's singles tennis title at the 1952 French Championships.

Seeds
The seeded players are listed below. Doris Hart is the champion; others show the round in which they were eliminated.

  Shirley Fry (finalist)
  Doris Hart (champion)
  Dorothy Head (semifinals)
  Susan Partridge (first round)
  Mary Terán de Weiss (quarterfinals)
  Ginette Bucaille (first round)
  Elena Lehmann (third round)
  Violette Rigollet (third round)
  Joan P. Curry (quarterfinals)
  Julia Wipplinger (quarterfinals)
  Raymonde Jones-Veber (third round)
  Jacqueline Patorni (second round)
  Hazel Redick-Smith (semifinals)
  Erika Vollmer-Obst (second round)
  Christiane Mercelis (third round)
  Joopy Van Der Wall-Roos (third round)

Draw

Key
 Q = Qualifier
 WC = Wild card
 LL = Lucky loser
 r = Retired

Finals

Earlier rounds

Section 1

Section 2

Section 3

Section 4

References

External links
   on the French Open website

1952 in women's tennis
1952
1952 in French women's sport
1952 in French tennis